Athletics competitions at the 1979 Pan American Games in San Juan were held from July 7 to 14 at the Estadio Sixto Escobar.

Medalists

Men's events

Women's events

Medal table

Participating nations

References

GBR Athletics

 
1979
Pan American Games
Athletics
1979 Pan American Games